Sistema Educativo Justo Sierra is a private school and university system in the Mexico City metropolitan area. Universidad Justo Sierra is a part of the system.

Its campuses include:
 Plantel Acueducto (Laguna Ticomán, Gustavo A. Madero) - Middle school, high school, and university
 Plantel Aragón (San Juan de Aragón, Gustavo A. Madero) - One middle school campus and one high school campus
 Plantel Azahares (Santa María Insurgentes, Cuauhtémoc) - High school
 Plantel Insurgentes (Lindavista, Gustavo A. Madero) - High school
 Plantel Jacarandas - One middle school campus and one high school campus
 Plantel Bachillerato Tecnológico - Bachillerato (high school diploma)
 Plantel Jardín - Kindergarten and primary school
 Plantel Cien Metros - University
 Plantel San Mateo (Naucalpan, State of Mexico) - Middle school, high school, and university
 Plantel Ticomán - University

References

External links
 Sistema Educativo Justo Sierra 

High schools in Mexico City
Universities in Mexico City